Dragon Express is a steel roller coaster located at Adventure World in Perth, Western Australia, Australia. The ride is a Zamperla Family Gravity Coaster and has been at the park since 27 September 2003.

Dragon Express is a steel-sit down roller coaster for everyone in the family. Dragon Express is a single train with 6 cars. Each car holds 2 riders. The riders are arranged 2 across in a single row of cars for a total of 12 riders.

See also
 MI1
 Turbo Mountain

References

External links
 

Roller coasters introduced in 2003
Roller coasters in Australia